Priamosia was formerly a genus of flowering plants in the Flacourtiaceae, consisting of one species of shrubs, Priamosia domingensis, which is native to the Dominican Republic and Haiti. Later studies indicated that Priamosia should be classified in the willow family, Salicaceae, and combined with the genus Xylosma. Priamosia was previously separated from the genus Xylosma because it has only four stamens, while Xylosma has eight or more.

References

Salicaceae
Historically recognized angiosperm genera